Østerholt is a village in Gjerstad municipality in Agder county, Norway. The village is located along the European route E18 highway, just northeast of the village of Sundebru.

References

Villages in Agder
Gjerstad